Claudio Cantelli, Jr. (born May 20, 1989 in Guarapuava) is a professional racing driver from Brazil.

Career

Formula Renault 2.0
After an early career in karting, in which he became a national champion, Cantelli made his single-seater debut in 2006 in the Brazilian Formula Renault 2.0 series. Driving for Dragão Motorsport and Cesário F.Renault, he took two podium places and three fastest laps to finish ninth in the standings.

During the same year, he also contested six races of the Eurocup Formula Renault 2.0 championship with Graff Racing, scoring a single point to be classified in 29th position. At the end of the season, Cantelli took part in the four-race British Formula Renault 2.0 Winter Series, held at Brands Hatch and Croft. Racing for the Position 1 team, he finished the championship in eleventh place.

International Formula Master
In 2007, Cantelli took part in the inaugural International Formula Master championship, which acted as a support series to the World Touring Car Championship. He scored a single point in the second race at Pau to end the season in 28th place.

Formula Renault 3.5 Series
In March 2008, Cantelli joined the new Ultimate Signature team to contest the Formula Renault 3.5 Series. He took part in the first five races of the season with the team, but was replaced by Esteban Guerrieri after the Monaco round. After missing the following event at Silverstone, Cantelli returned to the series at the Hungaroring, replacing Aleix Alcaraz at Italian team RC Motorsport. He finished in the points on one occasion, at the Nürburgring, to claim 28th place in the final standings.

Formula Three
After taking part in FR3.5 winter testing, Cantelli returned to South America in 2009 to compete in the South American Formula 3 Championship. Driving for Bassan Motorsport, he took three race victories and a further three podium places to finish as runner-up behind series champion Leonardo Cordeiro.

Racing record

Career summary

Complete Formula Renault 3.5 Series results
(key) (Races in bold indicate pole position) (Races in italics indicate fastest lap)

References

External links

1989 births
Living people
Brazilian people of Italian descent
Brazilian racing drivers
Formula 3 Sudamericana drivers
Formula Renault Eurocup drivers
British Formula Renault 2.0 drivers
Brazilian Formula Renault 2.0 drivers
International Formula Master drivers
World Series Formula V8 3.5 drivers
RC Motorsport drivers
JD Motorsport drivers
Graff Racing drivers
Signature Team drivers
Jenzer Motorsport drivers